Mason Paul James Burstow (born 4 August 2003) is an English professional footballer who plays as a forward for Chelsea.

Career

Charlton Athletic
Burstow came through the youth ranks at Welling United and Maidstone United before joining Charlton Athletic in 2020. He made his debut for the club on 31 August 2021 in a 6–1 EFL Trophy victory over Crawley Town where he scored Charlton's fifth goal of the night with his first touch in professional football.

Chelsea
On 1 February 2022, Burstow joined Premier League side Chelsea, remaining on loan at Charlton Athletic until the end of the 2021–22 season.

Career statistics

References

External links
 

2000 births
Living people
Association football midfielders
Welling United F.C. players
Maidstone United F.C. players
Charlton Athletic F.C. players
Chelsea F.C. players 
English footballers